Gène Hanssen (born 9 January 1959) is a former Dutch football player.

Hanssen spent most of his playing career with Eredivisie club Roda JC. At the end of his career, he had a brief spell with Verdy Kawasaki, but he left the club during its first season in the J1 League, the club agreeing to cancel his contract in July 1993.

Club statistics

References

External links

Profile at Voetbal International

1959 births
Living people
Dutch footballers
Dutch expatriate footballers
Roda JC Kerkrade players
VVV-Venlo players
Eredivisie players
J1 League players
Tokyo Verdy players
Expatriate footballers in Japan
Dutch expatriate sportspeople in Japan
Sportspeople from Kerkrade
Association football defenders
Footballers from Limburg (Netherlands)